Aurora is a city in Saint Louis County, Minnesota, United States. The population was 1,682 at the 2010 census.

Saint Louis County Highways 100 and 110 and State Highway 135 are three of the main routes in Aurora.

History
Aurora was laid out in 1898. A post office has been in operation at Aurora since 1903. The city was incorporated in 1903.

Geography
Aurora is surrounded by mixed coniferous/deciduous forest and is near many lakes.

Economy
Aurora is on northeastern Minnesota's Mesabi Range. This area produced a large quantity of the nation's iron and taconite ore.

Arts and culture

Annual cultural events
The Northern Lights Music Festival is presented each summer and includes music concerts. The festival is one of Minnesota's largest and presents professional opera, chamber music and symphonic concerts, in addition to student performances. It takes place in the first three weeks of July in six Iron Range cities.

Parks and recreation
Aurora is on the edge of the Superior National Forest, two miles (3 km) from Giants Ridge Golf and Ski Resort. Popular recreational activities include hunting, fishing, boating, four-wheeling, skiing, and snowboarding. There are many ATV and snowmobile trails on Aurora's outskirts, some of which extend all the way to Lake Superior.

Demographics

2010 census
As of the census of 2010, there were 1,682 people, 777 households, and 438 families living in the city. The racial makeup of the city was 98.2% White, 0.2% African American, 0.5% Native American, 0.1% Asian, and 1.0% from two or more races. Hispanic or Latino of any race were 0.5% of the population.

There were 777 households, of which 24.1% had children under the age of 18 living with them, 41.3% were married couples living together, 11.2% had a female householder with no husband present, 3.9% had a male householder with no wife present, and 43.6% were non-families. 37.8% of all households were made up of individuals, and 18.1% had someone living alone who was 65 years of age or older. The average household size was 2.09 and the average family size was 2.70.

The median age in the city was 48.4 years. 19.3% of residents were under the age of 18; 6.7% were between the ages of 18 and 24; 20.2% were from 25 to 44; 29.5% were from 45 to 64; and 24.4% were 65 years of age or older. The gender makeup of the city was 48.9% male and 51.1% female.

2000 census
As of the census of 2000, there were 1,850 people, 812 households, and 495 families living in the city. The racial makeup of the city was 98.38% White, 0.05% African American, 0.43% Native American, 0.38% Asian, 0.05% from other races, and 0.70% from two or more races. Hispanic or Latino of any race were 0.32% of the population. 17.4% were of Finnish, 13.2% German, 10.5% Norwegian, 9.1% Slovene, 7.3% Swedish, 6.6% Italian and 5.4% English ancestry according to Census 2000.

There were 812 households, out of which 22.2% had children under the age of 18 living with them, 48.6% were married couples living together, 8.4% had a female householder with no husband present, and 39.0% were non-families. 34.6% of all households were made up of individuals, and 17.4% had someone living alone who was 65 years of age or older.  The average household size was 2.19 and the average family size was 2.79.

In the city, the population was spread out, with 19.8% under the age of 18, 7.2% from 18 to 24, 22.6% from 25 to 44, 26.4% from 45 to 64, and 23.9% who were 65 years of age or older.  The median age was 45 years. For every 100 females, there were 95.6 males.  For every 100 females age 18 and over, there were 93.4 males.

The median income for a household in the city was $32,094, and the median income for a family was $43,095. Males had a median income of $41,413 versus $20,625 for females. The per capita income for the city was $17,442.  About 8.5% of families and 11.9% of the population were below the poverty line, including 26.0% of those under age 18 and 4.7% of those age 65 or over.

Infrastructure

Transportation
State Highway 135 (MN 135), County Highway 100, and County Highway 110 are three of the main routes in Aurora.

Notable people

Frederick A. Cina was born in Aurora in 1908. He was a lawyer and served as a Minnesota state representative.	
Frozen food magnate Jeno Paulucci was born in Aurora in 1918. Paulucci is famous for inventing the brands Chun King, Jeno's Pizza, Jeno's Pizza Rolls, Michelina's, Bundino's and many others.
Actress Francine York was born in Aurora to Sophie and Frank Yerich and moved to Hollywood, California to star in productions such as The Doll Squad, Curse of the Swamp Creature, plus several films with Jerry Lewis and Elvis Presley and countless TV shows including Perry Mason, Burke's Law and Lost in Space.

References

External links

 City of Aurora, MN – Official Website
 Aurora Chamber of Commerce

Cities in Minnesota
Cities in St. Louis County, Minnesota
Mining communities in Minnesota